In baseball statistics, a putout (denoted by PO) is given to a defensive player who records an out by tagging a runner with the ball when he is not touching a base (a tagout), catching a batted or thrown ball and tagging a base to put out a batter or runner (a force out), catching a thrown ball and tagging a base to record an out on an appeal play, catching a third strike (a strikeout), catching a batted ball on the fly (a flyout), or being positioned closest to a batter or runner called out for interference. The catcher is a defensive position for a baseball or softball player. When a batter takes his/her turn to hit, the catcher crouches behind home plate, in front of the (home) umpire, and receives the ball from the pitcher. In addition to these primary duties, the catcher is also called upon to master many other skills in order to field the position well. The role of the catcher is similar to that of the wicket-keeper in cricket. In the numbering system used to record defensive plays, the catcher is assigned the number 2.

The great majority of putouts recorded by catchers result from strikeouts, with almost all of the rest resulting from catching pop-ups and retiring runners tagged out or forced out at home plate, including attempts to steal home. On rare occasions, a catcher can record two putouts on a single play, usually by tagging out a runner trying to steal home immediately after the batter has struck out; on August 2, 1985, Carlton Fisk of the Chicago White Sox tagged out two New York Yankees moments apart at home plate when both tried to score on a double. The feat was duplicated by Paul Lo Duca of the New York Mets in Game 1 of the 2006 National League Division Series against the Los Angeles Dodgers. Putout totals are often not regarded as a strong indicator of a catcher's defensive skill because of the high number resulting from strikeouts. As trends in baseball have changed, with an increasing number of strikeouts per game, the proportion of catchers' putouts from strikeouts has risen steadily. In 1901, about 73% of catchers' putouts in the major leagues resulted from strikeouts (the figure is imprecise due to the occasional uncaught third strike either resulting in no putout or a putout being awarded to a different player); that figure rose to 78% in 1930, 84% in 1950 and 92% in 1980. In the 2021 season, 99% of catchers' putouts resulted from strikeouts; remarkably, the Atlanta Braves pitching staff recorded 1,417 strikeouts, but the team's catchers only recorded 1,394 putouts. Accordingly, putout totals for catchers have also risen steadily; through 2021, the top six major league catchers in career putouts, and 11 of the top 16, all made their major league debuts after 1990, with all 16 debuting in 1969 or later. Through 2021, 12 of the top 13 single-season totals were recorded in 2016 or later, and 90 of the top 100 were recorded since 1993.

Yadier Molina holds the record for the most putouts by a catcher with 15,122 through August 2022. Molina surpassed the previous holder on June 14, 2022, in the first game of a doubleheader against the Pittsburgh Pirates. Iván Rodríguez (14,864) is second all-time and the only other catcher to record 14,000 career putouts.

Key

List

Stats updated through the 2022 season.

Other Hall of Famers

Notes

References

External links

Major League Baseball statistics
Putouts as a catcher